Bogen Chapel is a chapel of the Church of Norway in Steigen Municipality in Nordland county, Norway. It is located in the village of Leirvikbogen. It is an annex chapel in the Steigen parish which is part of the Salten prosti (deanery) in the Diocese of Sør-Hålogaland. The white, wooden chapel was built in a long church style in 1926 using plans drawn up by the architect Sverre Kristiansen. In 1945, the chapel was temporarily occupied by the invading German army and used as a barracks for several months. In 1972, the chapel was extensively remodeled and restored.

See also
List of churches in Sør-Hålogaland

References

Steigen
Churches in Nordland
Wooden churches in Norway
20th-century Church of Norway church buildings
Churches completed in 1926
1926 establishments in Norway
Long churches in Norway